Maria Karolina Zofia Felicja Leszczyńska (23 June 1703 – 24 June 1768), also known as Marie Leczinska, was Queen of France as the wife of King Louis XV from their marriage on 4 September 1725 until her death in 1768. The daughter of Stanisław Leszczyński, the deposed King of Poland, and Catherine Opalińska, her 42-years and 9 months service was the longest of any queen in French history. A devout Roman Catholic throughout her life, Marie was popular among the French people for her numerous charitable works and introduced many Polish customs to the royal court at Versailles. She was the grandmother of the French kings Louis XVI, Louis XVIII and Charles X.

Early life
Born as a member of the House of Leszczyński, Maria Karolina Zofia Felicja Leszczyńska (Wieniawa) was the second daughter of Stanislaus I Leszczyński and his wife, Countess Catherine Opalińska. She had an elder sister, Anna Leszczyńska, who died of pneumonia in 1717.

Maria's early life was troubled by her father's political misfortune. Ironically, the hopeless political career of King Stanislaus was eventually the reason why his daughter Maria was chosen as the bride of King Louis XV of France. Devoid of political connections, his daughter was viewed by the French as being free from the burden of international alliances.

She was born in Trzebnica in Lower Silesia, the year before her father was made King of Poland by Charles XII of Sweden, who had invaded the country in 1704. In 1709, her father was deposed when the Swedish army lost the military upper hand in Poland, and the family was granted refuge by Charles XII in the Swedish city of Kristianstad in Scania. During the escape, Marie was separated from the rest of her family; she was later found with her nurse hiding in a crib in a stable, although another version claims it was actually a cave in an old mineshaft. In Sweden, the family was welcomed by the queen dowager Hedwig Eleonora of Holstein-Gottorp and became popular members of society life on the estates of the nobility around Kristianstad. In 1712, they made an official visit to Medevi, the spa of the Queen Dowager. During this period in her life, Marie began speaking Swedish with a Scanian accent. As Queen of France, she was known to welcome Swedish ambassadors to France with the phrase "Welcome, Dearest Heart!" in Swedish.

In 1714, Charles XII gave them permission to live in his fiefdom of Zweibrücken in the Holy Roman Empire, where they were supported by the income of Zweibrücken: they lived there until the death of Charles XII in 1718. Zweibrücken then passed to a cousin of his. These lands were parallel to the confiscated Polish properties of Stanislaus. Stanislaus appealed to the Regent of France, the Duke of Orléans, and the Duke of Lorraine for help, with the Queen of Sweden acting as his mediator.

In 1718, with the support of the Duke of Lorraine, the family was allowed to settle in Wissembourg in the province of Alsace, which had been annexed by France, a place suggested by Philippe II, Duke of Orléans, a nephew of Louis XIV and Regent of the Kingdom of France during Louis XV's minority. The family lived a modest life in a large town house at the expense of the French Regent.

Their lifestyle in Wissembourg was regarded as very below standard for a royal at that time; they lived in a small house, and could not pay the salary of their small retinue from which a few "served as an apology for a guard of honour", and the jewels of the former Queen Catherine were reportedly held as security by a moneylender.

While her mother Catherine and grandmother Anna Leszczyńska reportedly suffered from a certain degree of bitterness over their exile and loss of position which worsened their relationship with Stanislaus, whom they occasionally blamed for their exile, Marie was close to her father and spent a lot of time conversing with him, though she was evidently of a more rational nature as she "possessed the gift of suffering in silence and of never wearying others with her troubles" and was said to have developed "a profound and intense piety", which gave "to her youthful mind the maturity of a woman who no longer demands happiness".

Marriage

Early negotiations

Marie was not described as a beauty; instead her characteristics in the marriage market were stated as those of being pleasant, well-educated, and graceful in manner and movement. In 1720, she was suggested as a bride to Louis Henri de Bourbon, Prince of Condé (who preferred to be known as the Duke of Bourbon, rather than Prince of Condé), but her intended mother-in-law Louise Françoise de Bourbon refused to give her consent. The cavalry regiment provided by the Regent for the family's protection included the officer Marquis de Courtanvaux, who fell in love with Marie and asked the Regent to make him a duke so that he might ask for her hand, but the Regent refused and because of his low rank the marriage was impossible. Louis George, Margrave of Baden-Baden, and the third Prince of Baden were suggested, but these suggestions came to nothing  because of her insufficient dowry. Stanislaus unsuccessfully tried to arrange a marriage for her with the Count of Charolais, brother of the Duke of Bourbon. In 1724, Count d'Argensson proposed she marry the new Duke of Orléans, but her intended mother-in-law Françoise Marie de Bourbon wished for a dynastic match with political advantage.

In 1723, the Duke of Bourbon had become the Regent of France during the minority of Louis XV. The Regent was dominated by his lover, Madame de Prie. There were lengthy negotiations for a marriage between Marie and the now widowed Duke of Bourbon: Madame de Prie favored the match, as she did not perceive the reputedly unattractive Marie as a threat to her. The marriage negotiations, however, were soon overshadowed when marriage to King Louis XV, then aged fifteen, was given priority. That year, he fell ill and, fearing the consequences of the unmarried King dying without an heir, the Duc suggested getting him married as soon as possible. He was already engaged to Infanta Mariana Victoria of Spain, who had been brought to France as his future wife some years earlier, but as she was only five years old there would be no issue for many years. With the king sick, it was feared he might die without an heir and that the throne would pass to the Orléans line. This was an undesirable prospect for the Duke of Bourbon, who preferred that the throne should pass to the Spanish line rather than to the Orléans line. Louis XV's engagement was broken off and the Infanta was sent back to Spain, to the chagrin of the Spanish. The Duke of Bourbon and Madame de Prie began negotiations for the immediate marriage of the King to Marie.

Negotiations for marriage to the King

Marie was on a list of 99 eligible European princesses to marry the young King. She was not the first choice on the list. She had been placed there initially because she was a Catholic princess and therefore fulfilled the minimum criteria, but was removed early on when the list was reduced from 99 to 17 for being too poor. However, when the list of 17 was further reduced to four, the preferred choices presented numerous problems. Anne and Amelia of Great Britain, who were considered with the understanding that they would convert to the Catholic faith upon marriage, were favored by the Duke of Bourbon and Madame de Prie because it was supported by their political financiers, the firm of Paris Brothers Joseph Paris Duverney. Cardinal Fleury easily prevented the British match because of religious reasons. The last two were the sisters of the Duke of Bourbon, Henriette-Louise and Élisabeth-Alexandrine, whom the King himself refused to marry because of the disapproval of Cardinal Fleury. Cardinal Fleury himself favored a match with Princess Charlotte of Hesse-Rheinfels-Rotenburg, which was supported by the maternal grandfather of Louis XV, the King of Sardinia through his spy the Princess of Carignan, Maria Vittoria of Savoy.

In these complicated disputes over the choice of a royal marriage partner, Marie Leszczyńska eventually emerged as a choice acceptable to both the party of the Duke of Bourbon and Madame de Prie, as well as the party of Cardinal Fleury, mainly because she was politically uncontroversial and lacked any of the alliances which could harm either party. At this point, there were already negotiations of marriage between Marie and the Duke of Bourbon. The Duke of d'Argensson had already left a favorable report of her, and the groundwork had been done. Cardinal Fleury accepted the choice as Marie posed no threat to him because of her lack of connections, while the Duke of Bourbon and Madame de Prie, precisely because she lacked any personal power base, expected her to be indebted to them for her position. Marie was, finally, chosen because she was a healthy adult Catholic princess ready to procreate immediately after the wedding. Reportedly, Madame de Prie had a flattering portrait painted of Marie, in which she was deliberately made to look like the King's favorite portrait of his mother, and when he was shown it, he was impressed and exclaimed: "She is the loveliest of them all!" and became enthusiastic of the match, an episode which attracted some attention.

The formal proposal was made on 2 April 1725. The announcement of the wedding was not received well at the royal court. Marie's father Stanislaus had been a monarch for only a short time and she was thought to be a poor choice of inferior status not worthy of being queen of France. The Dowager Duchess of Lorraine, sister of the former Duke of Orléans, was also insulted that her own daughter Elisabeth-Therese had not been chosen. The nobility and the court looked upon the future queen as an upstart intruder, the ministers as a cause to diplomatic trouble with Spain and Russia, whose princesses had been refused in favor of Marie, and the general public was also reportedly initially dissatisfied with the fact that France would gain "from this marriage neither glory nor honor, riches nor alliances." There were rumors before the wedding that the bride was ugly, epileptic and sterile. On 6 May 1725, Marie was forced to undergo a medical examination, which ruled out epilepsy and also gave reassuring reports about her menstruation and ability to procreate. In the marriage contract, the same terms were given to her as were previously given to the Spanish Infanta, and she was thus guaranteed fifty thousand crowns for rings and jewelry, two hundred and fifty thousand crowns upon her wedding, and the further guarantee of an annual widow allowance of twenty thousand crowns.

Private relationship to Louis XV

The marriage by proxy took place on 15 August 1725 in the Cathedral of Strasbourg, Louis XV represented by his cousin the Duke of Orléans, Louis le Pieux. On her marriage, Maria's Polish name was changed to the French Marie. Despite her surname being difficult for the French to pronounce, it was still often used by commoners. She was escorted by Mademoiselle de Clermont, seven ladies-in-waiting, two maids-of-honour, numerous equerries and pages in a long train of coaches; however, she was not welcomed by triumphal entries, diplomatic greetings or the other official celebrations, as was normally the custom upon the arrival of a foreign princess for a royal marriage. Marie made a good impression upon the public from the beginning, such as when she handed out largesse on her way to her wedding in Fontainebleau.

Louis and Marie first met on the eve of their wedding on 4 September 1725 at the Château de Fontainebleau. Marie was twenty-two years old and Louis fifteen. The couple were reported to have fallen in love at first sight. Their relationship was happy at first and for eight years Louis XV was faithful to her. He had been impatient to marry her, was reportedly flattered to have a twenty-two-year-old wife, and refused to allow criticism of her appearance. 

In August 1727, at Versailles, Marie gave birth to twins, named Louise Élisabeth and Anne Henriette. The King was delighted, declaring that, after it had been said that he could not become a father, he had become the father of two. His first minister, Cardinal Fleury, however, was displeased and decided that until the Queen had given birth to a son she could not be allowed to accompany the King on his trips but had to stay at Versailles. A year later, to the King's disappointment, another daughter, Marie Louise, was born. The long-awaited dauphin, Louis, was born on 4 September 1729 to the relief of a country whose royal family had a history of failing to establish a secure male line of succession. 

Marie had ten live children, seven of whom survived to adulthood. They all regarded her as a model of virtue, particularly her daughters. Marie herself, being of a phlegmatic nature, was not known to show them much affection.

Marie was regarded as plain in appearance by her contemporaries but with a fresh and healthy complexion. That faded with age but piety precluded her from using artificial means to make herself look attractive. She was described as shy and reserved in the company of her husband. She considered it her duty to show him gratitude and reverence but was unable to relax enough to entertain him or to flirt with him. Once, for example, she could find no other way to entertain him than to suggest he to kill the flies in the window panes. 

Louis XV, who suffered from melancholy and boredom, became inclined to listen when Marie was unfavorably compared to other women, and Cardinal Fleury, who wished to prevent Marie from eventually getting any influence over the King, favored the idea of the King taking a mistress as long as she was apolitical.

Louis XV eventually became a notorious womanizer. In 1733, he entered into his first infidelity with Louise Julie de Mailly; until 1737, this relationship was not official, and she was known at court as the Fair Unknown. These years, Marie unsuccessfully tried to figure out who the mistress was and did display her displeasure over the state of affairs, but the adultery had the support of Cardinal Fleury because de Mailly was not interested in politics, and after the first years of the king's adultery, Marie became resigned to it. After the difficult birth of Princess Louise in 1737, which nearly took her life, Marie was advised by the doctors that another pregnancy may end her life, and from 1738, she refused Louis's entrance to her bedroom.

In parallel with this, Louise Julie de Mailly was officially recognized as the King's royal mistress and favorite at court, and the relationship between the King and Queen discontinued in all but name, though they continued to perform their ceremonial roles side by side. The King paid only purely ceremonial visits to her rooms and no longer participated in her card games. The court, wary of her loss of the King's affection, only attended to her when court representation required. Louise Julie de Mailly was followed by Pauline Félicité de Mailly in 1739, Marie Anne de Mailly in 1742 and Diane Adélaïde de Mailly also in 1742. During the serious illness of Louis XV in Metz in August 1744, when he was believed to be dying, Marie was given his permission to join him. She was cheered by the supporting public along her journey, but when she arrived, he no longer wished to see her. She and the clergy supported the idea of the King exiling his mistress Marie Anne de Mailly including her sister, and the idea that the King should make a public regret for his adultery, but this did not improve their marriage.

Madame de Pompadour was presented at court in 1745 and was given such an important and influential position at court until her death in 1764 that she somewhat eclipsed the Queen. The lovers of Louis were often given positions in the court of Marie in order for them to have a permanent access and official excuse to remain at court, which placed Marie in a difficult position. She regarded the first official mistress Louise Julie de Mailly as the most hurtful because she was the first one; however, she disliked Marie Anne de Mailly on a more personal level because Marie Anne was haughty and insolent. In contrast to the other official mistresses, Marie had a moderately friendly and cordial relationship to Madame de Pompadour, who always treated the Queen with deference and respect, though Marie did, unsuccessfully, oppose Pompadour's appointment as a lady-in-waiting in 1756. In contrast, Marie herself seems never to have had extramarital relations.

Queen of France

Political role
Queen Marie never managed to develop political influence. After her marriage, her appointed court consisted of a great number of followers of the Duke of Bourbon, among them Madame de Prie, the Duchess de Béthune, and the Marquise de Matignon, who, among her twelve ladies-in-waiting or dame du palais, the Duke's own sister, Marie Anne de Bourbon, became her Surintendante de la Maison de la Reine and Paris de Verney was appointed as her secretary. Cardinal de Fleury, who had been Louis's tutor, was appointed her grand almoner.

Marie had been given advice by her father to always loyally stand by the Duke of Bourbon, to whom she owed her marriage and position, and it was a favor to the Duke that Marie made her first attempt to interfere in politics. On 17 December 1725 the Duke of Bourbon, Madame de Prie and Paris de Verney attempted to banish Cardinal de Fleury through a plot. On their instruction, the Queen called on the King to come to her chambers, where the Duke de Bourbon was present. The doors were locked to ensure secrecy and the Duke presented the King with a report from their ambassador in Rome which blamed Fleury for the French failure in a dispute with the Pope. Bourbon asked the King if they should write a reply, which the King refused without the presence of Fleury. Meanwhile, Cardinal Fleury learned of the plot to discredit him and left the palace. The Duke and de Prie planned to use the absence of Fleury to have him confined to an abbey, and gave Marie the task of informing Louis XV that the absent Fleury wished to enter an Abbey and leave his position at court. This led to a crisis when the King gave Bourbon the choice to either expel Madame de Prie and Paris de Verney or be removed from his post of prime minister. This incident led to Cardinal Fleury categorizing Queen Marie as his opponent, and his decision to oust the ministry of the Duke of Bourbon. Cardinal Fleury warned the King that no woman should be allowed to participate in state affairs and that listening to women's advice would lead to disaster.

In June 1726, Fleury convinced the King to deprive the Duke of Bourbon of his ministry. Madame de Prie immediately enlisted the Queen to speak to the King in favor of Bourbon. She protested but agreed and reportedly spoke passionately about the affair to the King, but she was unable to succeed as the King reacted very negatively to her attempt to interfere in politics after the preparation from Fleury that women should not be allowed to participate in state affairs. The day following the fall of the Duke de Bourbon's ministry, Louis XV stated to Queen Marie that he demanded of her to let herself be directed by Cardinal Fleury in the future with the words:
"I beg, Madame, and, if necessary, I order you to place credence in everything that the former Archbishop of Frejus tells you on my behalf, as though he were I – Louis".

Marie's attempt to participate in state affairs during the events of 1726 resulted in a crisis in her relationship with Louis XV, and she sought advice on how to behave from the Princess of Carignano, whom unbeknownst to her was a spy in service of Savoy. The princess' advice was that as Queen of France, it was Marie's duty not to involve herself in political intrigues and plots, but to act as an example of virtue and piety; a role model of a "Catholic consort of the Most Christian King". Queen Marie accepted the advice and followed it for the rest of her life, as she was never again involved in any political activity. After the 1726 crisis and until the birth of a dauphin in 1729, Cardinal Fleury and the Princess of Carignano made long running preparations to replace Marie, preferably with Charlotte of Hesse-Rheinfels-Rotenburg, if she should die in childbirth.

Marie reconciled with Cardinal Fleury, whom she kept contact with through letters and humbly entrusted to advise her how to behave in order to please the King. Fleury and Marie developed a cordial relationship and he often granted her his support when he estimated that her request to the King was harmless; such as in 1742, when the Cardinal, on her request, persuaded the King to allow her to appoint her personal friend Amable-Gabrielle de Villars as Dame d'atours. Her political activity after 1726 was limited to asking Louis XV to grant a pension or a promotion to a friend, and she often used Cardinal Fleury as a mediator to achieve this.

Despite her lack of influence, she did have political views, and also some indirect political importance. During the War of the Polish Succession in 1733–1736, she supported her father's candidacy to the Polish throne, and upon her father's demand, she did her best to encourage Cardinal Fleury to support her father's candidacy, though she herself expressed to the Cardinal that she had never wished for the war and that she was an innocent cause of it because the French wished to enhance her dynastic status. After the war, her father was given the Duchy of Lorraine because he was the father-in-law of the King of France, and the Duchy became part of France after the death of her father who became Duke of Lorraine, thus making herself indirectly useful in the political arena. As a devout Catholic, Queen Marie gave her passive support to the so-called Dévots party at court, supported the bishops in their conflicts with the Parliament of Paris, and expressed sympathy for the Jesuit order in their conflict with the crown. It was also a fact, that if the King should die before his son was an adult, then she would in accordance with custom have become regent of France until his 13th birthday, which made Marie a potential regent from the birth of the dauphin until his 13th-birthday, a fact which would have been well known at court.

Role as queen

Queen Marie was initially not respected by the royal court, where she was regarded as low-born. Her lack of dynastic status and lack of connections left her without a political power base, and she did not manage to acquire any personal or political influence. She was not credited with any personal significance and not given much personal attention outside of her ceremonial role as queen.

As queen, Marie Leszczyńska performed her ceremonial role in strict accordance with formal court etiquette and regularly and punctually fulfilled all representational duties that the court life at Versailles demanded of her. She valued the ritualized pomp and court presentations in order to increase her dignity and win the respect of the court nobility, which was necessary because she had no prestigious dynastic connections of birth and was thus initially seen as low born by them: her successor as queen, Marie Antoinette, was to ignore many of these rules, and once pointed out, that in contrast to her predecessor Queen Marie Leszczyńska, it was not necessary for her to enhance her status and dignity since her dynastic status was evident by birth, and that she could therefore afford to relax on her etiquette without losing respect.

Marie was given an allowance of 100.000 livres for pleasure, charity and gambling, a sum which was in reality often irregularly paid and also insufficient, as she was often in debt. Though she had simple habits, her apartments at Versailles were not redecorated after 1737 - her favorite game, cavagnole, often placed her in debt, and the King was normally unwilling to pay these off for her.

She accepted that her courtiers were appointed because of rank rather than personal preference, and conversed politely with those who were in attendance. However, though she was careful to always fulfill her representational role, she never participated in court life outside of what was necessary to fulfill her ceremonial duties, and when they were done, she preferred to retire to her private apartments with an intimate circle of friends. Among her own private friends were her grand almoner Cardinal de Luynes, Duke Charles Philippe d'Albert de Luynes and her Dame d'honneur Marie Brûlart as well as the wealthy widow of the late Regent the Dowager Duchess of Orleans: Francoise Marie de Bourbon (legitimized daughter of Louis XIV and Madame de Montespan), who would invite and organized parties in her palaces in Paris for Marie Leszczyńska. Her other favorite lady in waiting was her Dame d'atour, Françoise de Mazarin, who supported Marie during the affair between her cousin, Louise Julie de Mailly and the King. Marie's private circle of friends was completed with the addition of President Hénault (her Surintendant since 1753) and Comte d'Argenson, whom she had asked not to address her with her title and with whom she also consulted when she wished to have a pension or a promotion given to a protégé. Like her mother, Marie maintained a political correspondence with Margareta Gyllenstierna, the spouse of Arvid Horn, after she had made her acquaintance during her stay in Sweden.

Queen Marie eventually did manage to win the respect of the court nobility by her strict adherence to court etiquette, which made her opinion at least formally important. In 1747, Voltaire was banished from the royal court through her influence. The reason were two incidents, both of which insulted the queen: During one long night of gambling, Voltaire's lover, Emilie du Chatelet, lost a fortune at the Queen's gambling table, during which Voltaire whispered to her in English that she had been cheated. This was regarded as an insult to the Queen, because it denounced her guests as cheats; Voltaire could have been arrested for his ill-timed remark. Shortly afterward, Voltaire wrote a poem in honor of his patron, the royal mistress Madame de Pompadour, in which he alluded to the sexual relationship between Pompadour and the King. This insulted Marie and led to the banishment of Voltaire from court.

When her first daughter-in-law died in 1746, the Queen, very fond and loving of her only son, opposed the selection of his next spouse, the Duchess Marie-Josèphe of Saxony, because she was the daughter of her father's rival, King Augustus III of Poland. Her dislike of the match was known but ignored, as she had no dynastic connections. Initially, this issue caused some friction between the Queen and her new daughter-in-law. However, the friction was soon overcome, reportedly because Marie-Josèphe was an admirer of the Queen's father. In honour of him, several of the Queen's grandsons received the name Stanislaus (Stanislas in French) at their christening.

Marie played some part as a cultural patron. Marie was the benefactor of the painter Jean-Marc Nattier, whom she commissioned in 1748 to paint the last portrait she ever sat for, an unusual one as it was informal. It was a major success for Jean-Marc, as it was printed and sold in prints. It was also her favorite portrait, which she had reproduced to give to friends. She was a great lover of music, painting and the promoter of many artists. She met the castrato Farinelli in 1737, and the young Mozart in 1764, whom she found very charming. During his visit to Versailles, she acted as an interpreter for her spouse and family who did not understand German. Her major contribution to life at Versailles was the weekly Polish choral concerts.

Queen Marie maintained the role and reputation of a simple and dignified Catholic queen. She functioned as an example of Catholic piety and was framed for her generosity to the poor and needy through her philanthropy which included establishing workhouses, livelihood programs and financial assistance for the poor as well as supporting orphanages and hospitals, which made her very popular among the public her entire life as Queen.

Death and burial

Marie Leszczyńska died on 24 June 1768, one day after her birthday, at the age of 65. She had enjoyed great popularity among the public in her early and later years. She was buried at the Basilica of St Denis, and her heart was entombed at the Church of Notre-Dame-de-Bonsecours in Nancy.

Children

Ancestry

References

Further reading

 Zieliński, Ryszard (1978). Polka na francuskim tronie. Czytelnik.
 Perey, Lucien (1893). Le président Hénault et Madame du Deffand. La cour du régent, la cour de Louis XV et de Marie Leczinska (in French) (4th ed.). Paris: Calmann Lévy.

External links

 Marie Leszczyńska‘s profile at en.chateauversailles.fr
 The taste of Marie Leszczyńska at en.chateauversailles.fr

|-

|-

|-

|-

1703 births
1768 deaths
People from Trzebnica
French queens consort
Maria
18th-century Polish nobility
Polish royalty
Burials at the Basilica of Saint-Denis
Daughters of kings